Connecticut Casual is the fourth studio album by American hip hop recording artist Apathy. It was released on June 3, 2014 through Demigodz Records and Dirty Version. The album is mostly produced by Apathy, along with other producers, such as Da Beatminerz on the first track of the same name as the album, Teddy Roxpin, Smoke the World on "The Grand Leveler", and The Doppelgangaz on "Beefin' Over Bitches" (which features Kappa Gamma on the track).

Description
Connecticut Casual has been described as an album that uncovers the darker sides of Connecticut and New England that most people are unfamiliar with. "From the opulent lifestyle of the Kennedy family, to the economically destitute neighborhoods of Connecticut, Rhode Island and Massachusetts. Mansions and projects. Tennis courts and bodegas. Summers spent on the shores of the Atlantic. Mysterious meetings in Masonic lodges. Homicides that go unsolved due to inadequate law enforcement budgets in poor areas, to literally getting away with murder by being well connected to East Coast royalty."

Background

Pre-release 
In July 2013, through his Twitter account, Apathy announced he was working on a new EP titled Connecticut Casual. Apathy later stated on Facebook that the EP would be available for free download. It was initially to be released Mid-April, 2014 but the date was pushed back to May, 2014, in the light of his supergroup Army of the Pharaohs' album In Death Reborn, being released commercially in April. On March 19, 2014, Apathy revealed that Connecticut Casual will be an album instead of an EP now and will drop on June 3, 2014. It contains production from Da Beatminerz, The Doppelgangaz, Teddy Roxpin, Smoke the World and Apathy himself. The first video/single is called The Grand Leveler and is produced by Smoke the World.

Track listing

Charts

Personnel
 Apathy - rap vocals, producer
Additional musicians
 Chris Webby - performer on "Back in New England"
 Kappa Gamma - performer on "Don't Give Up the Ship", "Jack Ruby", "Money Makes the World Go Round" and "Beefin' Over Bitches"
 Hayze - performer on "Money Makes the World Go Round"
 ANoyd - performer on "Locals Only!"
Additional personnel
 Smoke the World - producer on "The Grand Leveler"
 Teddy Roxpin - producer on "Back in New England" (also produced by Apathy) and "The Grass Ain't Greener"
 The Doppelgangaz - producers on "Beefin' Over Bitches"
 Da Beatminerz - producers on "Connecticut Casual"

References

Demigodz Records albums
Apathy (rapper) albums
2014 albums